The Railway Hotel is a former pub and hotel in Station Road, Edgware and a Grade II listed building with Historic England.

History 
The Railway Hotel was built and designed in 1931 by the architect A. E. Sewell for Truman Hanbury Buxton, brewers,  and opened in 1932.

The historic building closed in 2006 after not reaching health and safety standards. In 2013 the building was added to Historic England’s Heritage At Risk register. On 11 July 2016, having been empty the building caught fire early morning.

Damage and uncertainty 
Through the 2010s there were several owners, none making any significant progress. In 2016 an arson attack left a portion of the ground floor destroyed and the public began to fear developers would build new apartments after a lack of support from the council.

A petition, launched in 2016 to Historic England in an attempt to try and restore the building, received 2,287 signatures.

Announced in 2017 the building was listed at public auction with a minimum value of £2 million.

Renovation 
In September 2018 it was announced that it was to be renovated and turned into a restaurant. Work on this is currently underway.

References

External links 
http://www.francisfrith.com/uk/edgware/edgware-railway-hotel-1948_e126003
http://boakandbailey.com/2016/08/pub-preservation-railway-hotel-edgware/

Edgware
Defunct hotels in London
Former pubs in London
Grade II listed hotels
Grade II listed pubs in London
Grade II listed buildings in the London Borough of Barnet
A. E. Sewell buildings
Pubs in the London Borough of Barnet